Eskandar Firouz ( – ) was an Iranian environmentalist and politician. He was the first director of the Department of Environment in Iran. He developed Iran's ecological conservation and management program. Eskandar Firouz is recognized as the founder of environmental protection and conservation in Iran.

Early life 
Eskandar Firouz was born in 1926 in Shiraz to Mohammad Hossein Mirza Firouz (1894–1983), a Qajar prince. His paternal grandfather was Abdolhossein Farmanfarma (1857–1939).

He did his education outside Iran, first in Germany, then in the United States (Lawrenceville Preparatory School) and later at Yale University.

Career 
As an environmental conservationist, in 1971, he championed the formation of Iran's Department of Environment. In his tenure as the Director of DOE, Iran developed and adopted the Environmental Protection Law, which is still in force.

Firouz helped in creating the national parks, nature reserves, wildlife refuges and protected areas in Iran. He was appointed as the vice-president at the United Nations Conference on the Human Environment, held in Stockholm in 1972. Firouz was also a member of the presiding board of the International Union for the Conservation of Nature (IUCN) in 1973–75. In 1977, he was elected as President of the International Union for Conservation of Nature and Natural Resources (IUCN), a position that he never filled as the Shah forced the resignation of the government during the Revolution.

Firouz was one of the three founding founders of the Convention on Wetlands of International Importance – the “Ramsar Convention”.

Personal life 
Firouz married Iran Ala who is the daughter of the Hossein Ala (1881–1964), Iran's prime minister from 1955 to 1957. He had two daughters, named Anahita and Azar. He died on March 4, 2020, at the age of 93.

Notable works 
The Complete Fauna of Iran
Environment Iran
The wetlands and waterfowl of Iran
Memoirs of Eskandar Firouz

References 

People from Shiraz
Farmanfarmaian family
1926 births
2020 deaths
Heads of Department of Environment (Iran)
Iranian environmentalists
Iranian botanists
20th-century Iranian people
21st-century Iranian people